Bregal Sagemount is a private equity firm based in New York City.

History
Bregal Sagemount was founded in 2012 by former employees of Goldman Sachs and Great Hill Partners.  Gene Yoon, the Managing Partner at Bregal Sagemount, was previously the head of Private Capital Investing at Goldman Sachs in New York.

The firm's first fund, Bregal Sagemount I, L.P., was a $650 million investment vehicle.  A majority of the capital for this fund comes from Bregal Investments, the investment arm of Cofra Group, a Zug, Switzerland-based holding company formed by the Brenninkmeijer family following the founding of the first C&A store in Europe.

Bregal Sagemount announced Bregal Sagemount II, L.P., the firm's second fund, with $960 million of committed capital on February 7, 2017.

In March 2020, Bregal Sagemount completed the final closing for Breagal Sagemount Fund III at the Fund's hard cap of $1.5 billion, exceeding the target of $1.35 billion.

Investments
Bregal Sagemount invests in middle-market companies across a number of technology sectors, including software, tech-enabled business and consumer services, digital infrastructure, healthcare services and technology, financial technology, and specialty finance.  The firm typically invests between $25 million and $150 million in growth-oriented companies with greater than $15 million in revenue.

As stated on the firm's website, Bregal Sagemount provides capital for situations including: funding organic growth, facilitating mergers and acquisitions, providing shareholder liquidity, and buyouts.  The firm invests in both control and non-control (minority) transactions.

References

External links
 Official Website

Financial services companies established in 2012
Private equity firms of the United States
Privately held companies based in New York (state)
American companies established in 2012